Toms International is a Danish chocolate, liquorice and sugar confectionery producer, headquartered in Ballerup, Denmark. The company produces around 50,000 tons of chocolate and sugar confectionery annually which it supplies to customers in Denmark, Sweden, Norway and the United Kingdom. The company employs around 1,200–1,700 people, depending on the season, and in 2021 generated revenues of DKK 1.6 billion.

History 

Founded in 1924 as Tom Chokoladefabrik A/S by Copenhagen chemists Hans Trojel and Victor Hans Meyer, the company is now a world-renowned chocolate producer. Originally the chocolate was a side item for sale in the chemists' retail shop on Vesterbrogade in Copenhagen, the founders launched their own products on Prags Boulevard between 1925 and 1929.

The company was taken over by Victor B. Strand in 1942, who acquired the chocolate company Anthon Berg shortly after. In 1961, a new factory was designed by the famous Danish modernist architect Arne Jacobsen and consisted of a 22,000 m2 factory hall and a 3,000 m2 administration building on a site measuring 220,000 m2.

Around the time of the factory's completion in 1962, Toms acquired A/S J. Høeghs Lakrids og Sukkervarefabrikker, which shortly was renamed Pingvin Lakrids. Tom's final acquisition was that of A/S Galle & Jessen, in 1971.

In 2011, Toms acquired German company Hanseatische Chocolade GmbH and with it the company and chocolate brand Hachez.

Ownership 
The company is fully owned by Gerda og Victor B. Strands Fond.

Brands 

 Anthon Berg – a corporate division within Toms International, the company produced a diverse variety of chocolate products. The title "Purveyors to the Royal Danish Court" was awarded to Anthon Berg in 1957.
 Bogø Chokolade
 Holly Bar
 Nellie Dellies
 Toms
 Pingvin
 Yankie Bar – a popular chocolate bar in Denmark composed of caramel, nougat, and milk chocolate

Galle & Jessen 
 Ga-Jol
 Galle & Jessen

References

External links 
  (in Danish)

Brand name chocolate
Danish chocolate companies
Food and drink companies based in Copenhagen
Confectionery companies of Denmark
Purveyors to the Court of Denmark
Danish companies established in 1924
Food and drink companies established in 1924
Danish brands
Multinational companies headquartered in Denmark
Companies based in Ballerup Municipality